Bob and Mike Bryan were the three-time defending champions, but lost to the unseeded pair Leander Paes and Radek Štěpánek, 7–6(7–1), 6–2, in the final. With this win Paes completed the career grand slam in Men's doubles.

Seeds

Draw

Finals

Top half

Section 1

Section 2

Bottom half

Section 3

Section 4

References
General

External links
 2012 Australian Open – Men's draws and results at the International Tennis Federation

Men's Doubles
Australian Open (tennis) by year – Men's doubles